This is a list of episodes from the eighth season of Impractical Jokers.

Episodes

References

External links 
 Official website
 

Impractical Jokers
2019 American television seasons
2020 American television seasons